Pittwater, an electoral district of the Legislative Assembly in the Australian state of New South Wales, was created in 1973, replacing a large part of Collaroy and elections have generally been won by the Liberal party.


Members for Pittwater

Election results

Elections in the 2010s

2019

2015

2011

Elections in the 2000s

2007

2005 by-election

2003

Elections in the 1990s

1999

1996 by-election

1995

1991

Elections in the 1980s

1988

1986 by-election

1984

1981

Elections in the 1970s

1978

1976

1975 by-election

1973

Notes

References

New South Wales state electoral results by district